The 1999 Visa Sports Car Championships presented by Honda was the seventh round of the 1999 American Le Mans Series season.  It took place at Laguna Seca Raceway, California, on October 10, 1999.

Race results
Class winners in bold.

Statistics
 Pole Position - #1 Panoz Motor Sports - 1:15.974
 Fastest Lap - #1 Panoz Motor Sports - 1:18.129
 Distance - 
 Average Speed -

References

Monterey
Monterey Sports Car Championships
1999 in sports in California